Haouch El-Omara (in Arabic حوش الأمراء) also known as Shabab Zahle (in Arabic شباب زحلة) was a Lebanese basketball team who played in lower basketball divisions in Lebanon and successfully reached the division A during 2009-2010 season. The club is named after the region of Haouch El-Omara, a suburb of the Lebanese city of Zahlé. It plays its home games in Antonins Stadium in Zahle.

Sponsored by Mr Absi, Haouch El Oumara Zahle worked hard on their new roster and was able to create a strong and competitive team able to score a win on any of the strongest contenders of the  Lebanese Basketball League. They were able to sign many young prospects and contacted several Lebanese abroad players as well as some members from the Lebanese national team. However, the team folded in November 2011.

References 

Basketball teams in Lebanon
Basketball teams disestablished in 2011
2011 disestablishments in Lebanon
Zahlé District